Backchannel is an online magazine that publishes in-depth stories on technology-related news. Numerous prominent journalists have been recruited to write for the site, including Steven Levy, Andrew Leonard, Susan P. Crawford, Virginia Heffernan, Doug Menuez, Peter Diamandis, Jessi Hempel, and many others. In addition, Backchannel has interviewed many notable figures, such as Demis Hassabis of Google DeepMind and Orrin Hatch of the Republican Party.

Publication
Backchannel began as an in-house publication on the Medium website. In 2016, Backchannel was purchased by Condé Nast. In 2017, it was announced  that Backchannel would be moving off Medium and be hosted by Wired, while remaining editorially independent.

References

External links

Lemurtech Site

Technology blogs